The Klass I was the top level ice hockey league in Sweden from 1923 to 1927. It existed alongside the Swedish Ice Hockey Championship, where the national champion was crowned. Klass I existed along with the second-tier league Klass II. Klass I was replaced by the Elitserien as the top-level league in the 1927–28 season. Klass I continued to operate as the second-tier league, however, through the 1943–44 season.

Champions

External links
List of champions on hockeyarchives.info

 
Defunct ice hockey leagues in Sweden
swed